Karate  is the sports to be contested at the 2019 South Asian Games. Karate  will be hosted at the International Sports Complex, Satdobato, in Lalitpur, Nepal from 2 to 4 December 2019.

Medal table

Medalists

Kata

Kumite

Men

Women

References

2019 South Asian Games
Events at the 2019 South Asian Games
Karate at the South Asian Games